Douglas is a lowly populated locality and a rural centre in east Taranaki, surrounded by dairy, sheep and beef pastoral farming. It is situated 18 km east of Stratford at the intersection of East Road, Ohura Road, Douglas Road South and Bredow Road. East Road and Ohura Road meet to form State Highway 43, linking Stratford to the King Country town of Taumarunui. The Stratford–Okahukura Line, a secondary railway line, runs through Douglas where it veers north-east and away from the state highway for approximately 20 km.

Geography

Douglas is centred on the Toko Stream adjacent to a small saddle crossed by Ohura Road to the east. The wider locality takes in State Highway 43 from Gordon Road in the west to Mangaotuku Road in the east.

The reclaimed swamplands of the upper Toko valley are the dominant geographic feature, running from the north to the south-west of Douglas, at approximately 200m above sea level. Sandstone/greywacke ridges rise to between 300-370m altitude on each side of the valley floor. Peaks include Tarerepo trig to the north-east (366m altitude), Oruru trig to the south-east (329m) and Makuri trig to the south (327m). Crown Road provides access to farms below the Makuri trig, Bredow Road to farms below the Oruru trig, and Douglas Road to farms in the upper end of the valley (Tarerepo trig). Douglas Road links Douglas to Huiroa, Te Popo, Kiore and Matau.

East of Douglas State Highway 43 (Ohura Road) crosses the Douglas Saddle into the Makuri Valley, which runs parallel to the Toko at approximately 175m above sea level. This is also predominantly reclaimed swamp, while adjoining ridges rise with considerable precipitousness. Walter Road gives access to Makuri valley farms to the north of the main road.

History
Douglas is said to have been named for a member of the Crown's surveying party. It is called Oruru by Māori after the native owl ruru (or morepork). The current town was established at the turn of the 20th century and its hinterland cleared for pastoral farming. A hall was established in 1905 and a primary school in 1906. Through the first half of the century Douglas was a lively village with a productive brick kiln, a milk factory, a railway station, a store, a number of other businesses, and a church. In the 1930s the Douglas saleyards had the greatest turnover of all Taranaki saleyards, particularly in Jersey cattle for cream and cheese production. The Douglas Boarding House, which still stands today, served as an important stopping point for eastbound travellers making the long journey through difficult terrain to Whangamōmona or Taumarunui.

Like other rural settlements, Douglas went into decline from the mid-20th century. Its primary school, which opened in 1906, closed at the end of 2005, and pupils were transferred to nearby Toko School. The community hall and tennis courts remain in the possession of the community.

Douglas statistical area

Douglas statistical area had a population of 672 at the 2018 New Zealand census, an increase of 27 people (4.2%) since the 2013 census, and a decrease of 21 people (−3.0%) since the 2006 census. There were 240 households, comprising 348 males and 321 females, giving a sex ratio of 1.08 males per female. The median age was 34.4 years (compared with 37.4 years nationally), with 189 people (28.1%) aged under 15 years, 93 (13.8%) aged 15 to 29, 324 (48.2%) aged 30 to 64, and 66 (9.8%) aged 65 or older.

Ethnicities were 95.1% European/Pākehā, 11.6% Māori, 0.9% Pacific peoples, 0.0% Asian, and 2.2% other ethnicities. People may identify with more than one ethnicity.

The percentage of people born overseas was 7.1, compared with 27.1% nationally.

Although some people chose not to answer the census's question about religious affiliation, 57.6% had no religion, 34.8% were Christian, and 0.4% had Māori religious beliefs.

Of those at least 15 years old, 60 (12.4%) people had a bachelor's or higher degree, and 117 (24.2%) people had no formal qualifications. The median income was $31,900, compared with $31,800 nationally. 66 people (13.7%) earned over $70,000 compared to 17.2% nationally. The employment status of those at least 15 was that 288 (59.6%) people were employed full-time, 96 (19.9%) were part-time, and 15 (3.1%) were unemployed.

Notable residents
 David Walter (born 1939), chairman of Taranaki Regional Council, mayor of Stratford District Council, chairman of Stratford County Council
 Edward Walter (1866–1932), member of parliament representing the Stratford electorate (1925–1928) and grandfather of David Walter 
 Alan Smith (born 1942), All Black & Taranaki Rugby Football representative

References

Further reading

Stratford District, New Zealand
Populated places in Taranaki